The GE 70-ton switcher is a 4-axle diesel-electric locomotive built by General Electric between about 1942 and 1955. It is classified as a B-B type locomotive. The first series of "70 tonners" were a group of seven center-cab locomotives built for the New York Central Railroad in November 1942.  These units differ from the later end-cab versions.  Locomotives exported to Brazil were known as GE 64T and nicknamed "scooters".

Survivors
Two of the end-cab versions exist on display at the Whippany Railway Museum, Whippany, New Jersey, United States, originally purchased by the Rahway Valley Railroad, headquartered in Kenilworth New Jersey, as RV16 and RV17. They were placed into service in 1951 and 1954, respectively, and operated through the closing of the shortline rail business in 1990. Both are owned by the United Railroad Historical Society of New Jersey. Restoration was done on site in Whippany.

Preservation

Frisco (St. Louis – San Francisco Railway) 70-ton #111 B&Y scheme at Heart of the Heartlands.

Baltimore & Annapolis Railroad No. 50 resides at the B&O Railroad Museum  in Baltimore, Maryland.

Southern Pacific 5119 resides at the Pacific Southwest Railway Museum Association in Campo, California. It is maintained in operational condition and is regularly used in excursion service over a section of the San Diego & Arizona Railway.

High Point, Thomasville & Denton Engine #202, a 1948 General Electric 70-ton, has been restored by a private owner and is currently used as one of two locomotives for a recreational railroad at Denton FarmPark in Denton, North Carolina.

A GE 70-ton in metric gauge and C-C trucks is in operation at the railway museum line of Brazilian Railway Preservation Association (ABPF) in Campinas - SP. It is painted in Mogiana Livery and carries ABPF Nº 03

Only one of the center-cab locomotives exists, former Ellwood Engineered Castings 6114B preserved by the Tod Engine Foundation  in Youngstown, Ohio.

References

70-ton switcher
B-B locomotives
Diesel-electric locomotives of the United States
Railway locomotives introduced in 1947
Standard gauge locomotives of the United States